Agathidium atrum is a species of round fungus beetles in the family Leiodidae. It is black with the sides of the thorax, legs and antenna brown. It is found in Europe, Russia (European, Siberia, Far East), Armenia, Azerbaijan, Georgia, Turkey and Iran.

References 

Leiodidae
Beetles of North America
Beetles described in 1798